Sean Paul (born 1973) is a Jamaican dancehall and reggae artist.

Sean Paul may also refer to:
Sean Paul Joseph (born 1978), American rapper, member of the hip hop duo YoungBloodZ also known as Sean P
Sean Paul Lockhart (born 1986), American actor, director and producer
Sean Paul Morris (born 1983), American lacrosse player